Iskandar Zulkarnain or Iskandar the Great may refer to:
 Alexander the Great in the Quran
 Cyrus the Great in the Quran
 Hikayat Iskandar Zulkarnain
 Iskandar Zulkarnain Zainuddin (born 1991), Malaysian badminton player